Fire Island Inlet is an inlet on the south shore of Long Island, New York.

It connects the Great South Bay with the Atlantic Ocean, passing  between Robert Moses State Park (the western end of Fire Island) on the south and Oak Beach and Captree State Park (the eastern end of Jones Beach Island) on the north. The inlet is directly south of West Islip, the nearest town on the main part of Long Island.

Fire Island Inlet has evolved over the years due to natural processes, especially longshore drift. Jones Island and Fire Island at one time were connected.

The northwest side of the mouth of the inlet is known as the Sore Thumb, and is a man-made barrier that was created to try to combat the extensive erosion of the beaches inside the inlet. The southeast side of the mouth of the inlet is known as Democrat Point and is known as a popular surfing spot for beach goers, as well as a popular 4x4 fishing area. It is also the site of extensive preserves for the area's birds.

References

External links
Army profile of inlet

Babylon (town), New York
Fire Island, New York
Inlets of New York (state)
Bodies of water of Suffolk County, New York